École Française Internationale de Casablanca is a French international school in Casablanca, Morocco. 

It serves levels primaire (primary school) and collège (junior high school, opened in 2018) through lycée (senior high school, to open in 2021).

French International School of Casablanca, is also a Cambridge International Examinations center.

References

External links
 École Française Internationale de Casablanca 

French international schools in Casablanca